Miles Poindexter (April 22, 1868September 21, 1946) was an American lawyer and politician. As a Republican and briefly a Progressive, he served one term as a United States representative from 1909 to 1911, and two terms as a United States senator from 1911 to 1923, representing the state of Washington.  Poindexter also served as United States Ambassador to Peru during the presidential administrations of Warren Harding and Calvin Coolidge.

Early life
Poindexter was born in Memphis, Tennessee, the son of Josephine (Anderson) Poindexter and William B. Poindexter.  His parents were residents of Malvern Hill in Henrico County, Virginia, and his father was an American Civil War veteran of the Confederate States Army.  Poindexter was raised in Virginia, and attended the Fancy Hill Academy in Rockbridge County, Virginia. He then attended Washington and Lee University in Lexington, Virginia, from which he graduated with an LL.B. degree in 1891.

Political career 
In 1908, Poindexter was elected to the U.S. House. He served one term (1909–1911), and was reelected in 1910.  He resigned before his new term began in March 1911 because the state legislature elected him to the U.S. Senate. He was reelected in 1916, and served from 1911 to 1923. Poindexter became a Progressive Party member in 1912, but returned to the Republicans in 1915. Poindexter was an unsuccessful candidate for the Republican nomination for president in 1920, and for reelection to the Senate in 1922. In 1923, Poindexter was appointed Ambassador to Peru. He served until 1928, when he returned to Washington and waged an unsuccessful campaign for the Senate.

Legal career
After he graduated, Poindexter settled in Walla Walla, Washington, where he was admitted to the bar and began the practice of law.  In 1892 he became the prosecuting attorney of Walla Walla County.  He moved to Spokane, Washington in 1897 where he continued the practice of law.  He served as the assistant prosecuting attorney for Spokane County from 1898 to 1904, and as a judge of the superior court from 1904 to 1908.

Political career
He was elected as a Republican to the Sixty-first Congress, and served from March 4, 1909 to March 3, 1911 representing Washington's newly created 3rd congressional district.  He was reelected in 1910, but resigned in 1911 because the Washington State Legislature elected him to the U.S. Senate.  He was reelected in 1916, and served from March 4, 1911 to March 3, 1923. Poindexter left the Republican Party in 1913 to join the Progressive Party, rejoining the Republicans in 1915.

During World War I, Poindexter moved away from supporting progressive causes and led several efforts that questioned the patriotism of German-Americans and attempted to keep them from wartime leadership positions in the military. In a highly-publicized instance, Poindexter accused German-born Colonel Carl Reichmann (1859–1937), a distinguished Army officer who had served since 1881, of being pro-German and used the legislative process to block Reichmann's promotion to brigadier general. Reichmann had become a US citizen in 1887 and the promotion was supported by American Expeditionary Forces commander John J. Pershing, Hugh L. Scott, the Army Chief of Staff, and Newton D. Baker, the Secretary of War, but they were unable to overcome Poindexter's opposition and Reichmann remained a colonel.  Poindexter also played a role in instigating the First Red Scare by accusing the Wilson administration of being infested with Bolshevism and accusing United States Supreme Court Associate Justice Louis Brandeis of being a communist. Poindexter was a target of reformers and progressives in 1922, and lost his bid for reelection to the Democratic nominee, Representative Clarence Dill.

Committee chairmanships
During his Senate tenure, Poindexter served as chairman of the following committees:

 United States Senate Committee on Expenditures in the Interior Department (Sixty-second Congress)
 United States Senate Committee on Mines and Mining (Sixty-second Congress, Sixty-sixth Congress and Sixty-seventh Congress)
 United States Senate Committee on Pacific Islands and Puerto Rico (Sixty-second Congress)
 United States Senate Committee on Expenditures in the War Department (Sixty-third Congress and Sixty-fourth Congress)
 United States Senate Committee on Indian Depredations (Sixty-fifth Congress)

Later life
Poindexter ran in the 1920 Republican Party presidential primaries, but was not a serious contender for the party's nomination.   He received the votes of 20 delegates on the first ballot at the 1920 Republican National Convention, and the nomination went to Warren G. Harding on the 10th ballot.   After he lost his 1922 campaign for reelection to the Senate, in 1923 Harding appointed Poindexter as United States Ambassador to Peru.  He served until 1928, when he resigned and returned to Washington.  He was an unsuccessful candidate that year for the United States Senate.

Retirement and death
After the death of his wife, Poindexter returned to his home, "Elk Cliff" in Greenlee, near Natural Bridge Station, Virginia.  He died there on  September 21, 1946, and was buried at Fairmount Memorial Park in Spokane.

Family
In 1892, Poindexter married Elizabeth Gale Page (1866–1929) of Walla Walla.  They were the parents of a son, Gale Aylett Poindexter (1893–1976).

Poindexter remarried in 1936, becoming the husband of Elinor Jackson Junkin Latane, the widow of John Holladay Latane, a professor at Johns Hopkins University.

Elizabeth Gale Page was the granddaughter of Joseph Gale, an executive of the Provisional Government of Oregon.  She and Miles Poindexter were the aunt and uncle of actress Gale Page.

See also
 List of United States senators who switched parties

References

Sources

Books

Newspapers

Internet

External sources

Archives
 Miles Poindexter Papers. 1897-1940. 189.79 cubic feet (442 boxes).
 Miles Poindexter photograph collection. circa 1910-1920. .12 cubic feet (4 folders). 162 photographic prints.
 Thomas Burke papers. 1875-1925. 24.78 cubic feet (58 boxes).
 Austin E. Griffiths papers. 1891-1952. 11.73 cubic feet (25 boxes). 1 microfilm reel.

1868 births
1946 deaths
Candidates in the 1920 United States presidential election
20th-century American politicians
Ambassadors of the United States to Peru
Politicians from Memphis, Tennessee
Politicians from Walla Walla, Washington
Washington (state) Progressives (1912)
Republican Party United States senators from Washington (state)
Washington and Lee University School of Law alumni
Republican Party members of the United States House of Representatives from Washington (state)
Old Right (United States)
American anti-communists
Progressive Party (1912) United States senators